was a limited express service operated by Kitakinki Tango Railway and West Japan Railway Company (JR West) between  and  and/or  stations. The term also referred to the KTR001 series (currently used for Tango Relay services between Fukuchiyama and Toyooka) rolling stock itself. "Tango" refers to the  region of northern Kyoto Prefecture.

Prior to 1999, the Tango Explorer operated from Kyoto Station, but with the introduction of the Tango Discovery service, Tango Explorer services begi at Shin-Osaka.

Services
Tango Explorer services were generally run with three-car trains, though during peak holiday periods six-car trains (three paired sets) are used. When the Tango Explorer KTR001 series trainset was out of operation, KTR8000 series DMUs (used on the Tango Discovery service) or JNR 183 series EMUs were sometimes used.

Terminuses are in bold.

 -  -  -  -  - - -  - -  - -  -  -  -  -  -  -  -  -  - 

The Tango Explorer 2 stopped at Kuroi and Tanikawa.
The Tango Explorer 3 stopped at Shin-Sanda, Aino, Tanikawa and Kuroi.

Named passenger trains of Japan
Railway services introduced in 1990
Railway services discontinued in 2011